Giuseppe Rapisarda  (born 6 September 1985) is a Swiss football player. He currently plays for FC Wohlen.

External links
 Statistics at T-Online.de 
 FC Aarau profile 
 Swiss Football League profile
 FC Zurich stats 

1985 births
Living people
Swiss men's footballers
FC Aarau players
FC Zürich players
FC Wohlen players
FC Baden players
FC Chiasso players
Swiss Super League players
Association football defenders